The Virginia House of Delegates election of 1987 was held on Tuesday, November 3. Primary elections were held on June 9, 1987.

Results

Overview 

Source

See also 
 1987 United States elections
 1987 Virginia elections
 1987 Virginia Senate election

References 

House of Delegates
Virginia
Virginia House of Delegates elections